Mirza Mohammad Farrokhi Yazdi (1889 – October 18, 1939),  also known as Taj osh-Sho'arā (تاج الشعرا), was an Iranian poet, journalist and senior politician of the Perisan Constitutional Revolution and the Reza Pahlavi era.

Biography
Born in Yazd and his father was Mohammad Ebrahim Yazdi, he started his preliminary education in Yazd until the age of 16 when he was expelled from school for his poems against school teachers and principal.

By the age of 16, he had already started writing poetry and gradually became active during the Persian Constitutional Revolution and was imprisoned because of writing material in opposition to the infamous 1919's Anglo-Persian Agreement. In prison, he protested that “He whose only offense is love of the motherland / No creed would condemn to a dark cell…”.

Farrokhi Yazdi composed a poem criticizing Zeygham al-Dawla Qashqa'i, the ruler of Yazd, and in response Zeigham al-Dawla ordered to sew his mouth with thread and needle and throw him in prison. In 1921, he published the political newspaper Toufan (storm), winning fame for his poetry and constant attacks against Reza Pahlavi in his editorials.

Finally, in 1939, he was arrested, sentenced to prison at Tehran's Qasr prison. He was murdered by air injection under Dr. Ahmad Ahmadi.

He has written a poem related to British politician, Lord Curzon:

Lord Curzon has gotten angry
He is going to write a lament;
We don't exchange dignity with abasement
We don't obey embassy;
O' Curzon, abandon us
You can't exploit the country of Jamshid;

See also

 Mohammad Taghi Bahar
 Abdolhossein Teymourtash

References

 
 
 محمد فرخی یزدی 

20th-century Iranian poets
People from Yazd
1889 births
1939 deaths
Iranian people who died in prison custody
People of the Persian Constitutional Revolution
Prisoners who died in Iranian detention
Socialist Party (Iran) politicians
Members of the 7th Iranian Majlis
19th-century Iranian poets
1939 murders in Iran